The Elicini (synonym Gaetuliini) are a tribe of planthoppers in the family Tropiduchidae.  The type genus is Elica.

Genera
Fulgoromorpha Lists on the Web includes:

 Acrisius Stål, 1862
 Afroelfus Gnezdilov, 2012
 Alleloplasis Waterhouse, 1839
 Austris Szwedo & Stroinski, 2010
 Bambomada Gnezdilov & Bourgoin, 2015
 Bolitropis Gnezdilov & Bourgoin, 2015
 Busas Jacobi, 1909
 Conna Walker, 1856
 Connelicita Wang & Bourgoin
 †Dakrutulia Szwedo, 2019
 Danepteryx Uhler, 1889
 Dictyobia Uhler, 1889
 Dictyonia Uhler, 1889
 Dictyonissus Uhler, 1876
 Dictyssa Melichar, 1906
 Dictyssonia Ball, 1936
 Dyctidea Uhler, 1889
 Elica - monotypic Elica latipennis Walker, 1857
 Exphora Signoret, 1860
 Gaetulia Stål, 1864
 Gamergomorphus Melichar, 1906
 Gamergus Stål, 1859
 Indogaetulia Schmidt, 1919
 Johannesburgia Distant, 1907
 Laberia Stål, 1866
 Misodema Melichar, 1907
 Neaethus Stål, 1861
 Nubithia Stål, 1859<
 Nurunderia Distant, 1909
 Osbornia Ball, 1910
 Paragamergomorphus Synave, 1956
 Paralasonia Muir, 1924
 Pucina Stål, 1866
 Riancia Signoret, 1860
 Salona Stål, 1866
 Selamorpha Campodonico, 2018
 †Senogaetulia Szwedo, 2019
 †Tritophania Jacobi, 1938

References

Further reading

External links

Hemiptera tribes
Elicinae
Elicini